Tyrone Javar Scott (born March 27, 1999) is an American football wide receiver for the Missouri State Bears. Scott previously played for Central Michigan.

High school career 
Scott attended Jenkins High School in Savannah, Georgia. With Jenkins, Scott recorded 106 receptions for 2,165 yards and a school record 22 touchdowns. Scott would be named to the all-region team, and would commit to Central Michigan University to play college football over offers from Georgia Southern, Boston College, and Appalachian State.

College career

Central Michigan 
Scott red-shirted in 2018. The following season, Scott received significant playing time, starting ten games, while tallying 37 receptions, 650 yards, and five touchdowns. In the 2020 season, Scott would only appear in two games catching four passes for 33 yards. In March 2021, Scott announced his decision to transfer.

Missouri State 
In April 2021, Scott announced he would be transferring to Missouri State University. Scott would make an immediate impact with the Bears as Scott would set school records for receptions, receiving yards, and touchdowns. Scott's final stats for the season included 66 receptions, 1,110 yards receiving, and eight touchdowns. Scott would record a career high ten receptions against North Dakota and 174 receiving yards against Dixie State.Scott was named to the First-team All-Missouri Valley Conference at the season's end. Entering the 2022 season, Scott had high expectations from the media. In week 2, Scott would haul in a career high three touchdowns.

References

External links 

 Missouri State Bears bio
 Central Michigan Chippewas bio

Living people
1999 births
Central Michigan Chippewas football players
Missouri State Bears football players
American football wide receivers
Players of American football from South Carolina
African-American players of American football